Blangoua is a town and commune in Cameroon. It is located on the Chari River, which runs throughout some of Cameroon. It is the northernmost settlement of the country.

See also
Communes of Cameroon

References

 Site de la primature - Élections municipales 2002 
 Contrôle de gestion et performance des services publics communaux des villes camerounaises - Thèse de Donation Avele, Université Montesquieu Bordeaux IV 
 Charles Nanga, La réforme de l’administration territoriale au Cameroun à la lumière de la loi constitutionnelle n° 96/06 du 18 janvier 1996, Mémoire ENA. 

Communes of Far North Region (Cameroon)